The Campania regional election of 2015 took place on 31 May 2015. The centre-left candidate Vincenzo De Luca defeated incumbent governor Stefano Caldoro and became the new President of Campania.

Results

See also
2015 Italian regional elections

References

Elections in Campania
2015 elections in Italy
May 2015 events in Italy